Blackie/Wilderman Farm Airport  is located  southeast of Blackie, Alberta, Canada.

References

External links
Page about this airport on COPA's Places to Fly airport directory

Registered aerodromes in Alberta
Vulcan County